Polly A. Peyer is a retired major general in the U.S. Air Force.  She previously commanded the Warner Robins Air Logistics Center at Robins AFB in Warner Robins, Georgia.

She has served as the Director of Logistics, Headquarters Pacific Air Forces, at the Hickam Air Force Base in Hawaii.  In addition she served as military assistant to the acting Secretary of the Air Force.

Education
 Bachelor's degree in Criminology from Florida State University in 1971.
 Master's degree in Business Administration from the University of Northern Colorado in 1980.

References

External links
Official Profile
Additional Info

Florida State University alumni
Living people
Year of birth missing (living people)
Dwight D. Eisenhower School for National Security and Resource Strategy alumni
Recipients of the Legion of Merit
Recipients of the Defense Superior Service Medal
Female generals of the United States Air Force
21st-century American women